is a former Japanese football player.

Playing career
Matsushima was born in Obihiro on April 30, 1980. After graduating from high school, he joined J1 League club Shimizu S-Pulse in 1999. Although he played several matches from first season, he could hardly play in the match. In 2001, he moved to J2 League club Ventforet Kofu. He played many matches as substitute forward in 2 seasons and retired end of 2002 season.

Club statistics

References

External links

geocities.jp

1980 births
Living people
Association football people from Hokkaido
Japanese footballers
J1 League players
J2 League players
Shimizu S-Pulse players
Ventforet Kofu players
Association football forwards
People from Obihiro, Hokkaido